Johann Friedrich Schulze (27 January 1793 – 9 January 1858) was a German organ builder, from a family of organ builders. The company built major organs in Northern Germany and England.

Career 
Schulze was born in Milbitz, the only child of Johann Andreas Schulze (1753–1806) and his wife. He founded his own company in 1815 and moved its location in 1826 to Paulinzella. He was known as one of Europe's most famous organ builders. He and Eberhard Friedrich Walcker are regarded as leaders in productivity and progressivity in the trade.

Schulze married Johanna Dorothea Sophia (née Kühn) from Oberrottenbach in 1820. They had a daughter and six sons, two of whom, Edmund Schulze and Eduard Schulze (1830–1880), also became organ builders. He died in Paulinzella.

His two sons took over the family business, named "J. F. Schulzes Söhne". They were assisted by their brother Oskar Schulze (1825–1878), and another brother, Herwart Schulze (1836–1908), who worked as a sculptor. In 1881, when all brothers had died, the company was dissolved.

Works 

More than 100 organs by Johann Friedrich Schulze are known, including:
 1815 , his first work
 1827 Stadtkirche in Rastenberg, built with Johann Gottlob Töpfer from Weimar
 1830 Church in 
 1831  in Heiligenstadt (replaced in 1973)
 1843 St. Michaelis in Heringen, Thuringia
 1845  in Berlin (burnt in 1945)
 1847 
 1850 Bremen Cathedral
 1851 Main organ at the Marienkirche in Lübeck (built until 1854, burnt in 1942)
 1851 The Crystal Palace, London
 1853  in Rügenwalde, Pomerania
 1857 St. Nikolai in 
 1857 

Works by his sons included:
 1868: St. Bartholomew's Church, Leeds
 1868: St. Matthias, Eischleben
 1869 Große Kirche Aplerbeck

Literature 
 Hans-Christian Tacke: Johann Gottlob Töpfer, Leben - Werk - Wirksamkeit. Kassel 2002, .
 Markus Vette, Rolf Bothe, Albrecht Lobenstein: Zur Restaurierung der Schulze-Orgel in der Coudray-Kirche in Rastenberg. Eugenia-Verlag, Rastenberg 2011, .
 Wolfram Hackel: Die Orgelbauerfamilie Schulze. In: Einweihung der restaurierten Schulze-Orgel in der Reformierten Kirche Iserlohn. 40 Jahre Evangelische Kantorei Iserlohn. Iserlohn, 1994. 
 Archiv der ev.-luth. Kirchgemeinde Königsee: Traubuch von Milbitz und Oberrottenbach: entry of 15 June 1820, seen 8 May 2017

References

External links 
 

German pipe organ builders
1793 births
1858 deaths